Marko Lerinski (20 June 1862 – 13 June 1902) was the nickname of Georgi Ivanov Gyurov (Георги Иванов Гюров), also known as Georgi Geroyski, a Bulgarian military expert and revolutionary. A prominent member of the Internal Macedonian–Adrianople Revolutionary Organization (IMARO), Lerinski was the first person to propose a common anti-Ottoman uprising in Macedonia and Thrace.

Gyurov was born in Kotel in Ottoman Rumelia (Northern Thrace), today a town in central eastern Bulgaria. In 1883, he joined the Principality of Bulgaria's armed forces. He took part in the Serbo-Bulgarian War of 1885. For his bravery, he was awarded a medal and promoted; his comrades even nicknamed him Geroyski (Геройски), "heroic". In 1895, he left the Bulgarian Army to join the Supreme Macedonian–Adrianople Committee and take part in its 1895 organized anti-Ottoman action, which involved the burning of Dospat. After the action's failure, he returned to the army as a non-commissioned officer.

In 1900, he got in contact with Macedonian Bulgarian revolutionaries Gotse Delchev and Gyorche Petrov, who recruited him in IMARO. They dispatched him as a regional leader (voivode) for the Lerin region (today Florina, Greece), where his nickname comes from. Other IMARO voivodes from the Principality of Bulgaria, such as Hristo Chernopeev, were also recruited at the time. Thanks to Lerinski's military training and his organizational abilities, his armed detachment became what was essentially a school for voivodes and members for the entire IMARO. According to fellow IMARO member and writer Hristo Silyanov, Marko Lerinski turned Lerin into "... a region of model in every respect. Enthustiastic activists, strict organization, a disciplined and, in the full sense of the words, propagandist and organizational detachment. That was all the work of Marko from Kotel."

Marko Lerinski was the first person to suggest a common uprising in both Macedonia and the Adrianople Vilayet, an idea that would be put into practice with the Ilinden–Preobrazhenie Uprising of 1903. However, he did not live to witness the uprising. After his detachment's location was reported to the Ottoman authorities, Lerinski died in a battle with Ottoman forces near Patele (Agios Panteleimonas, Florina) on 13 June 1902 and was buried in Sorovich.

References

 

1862 births
1902 deaths
People from Kotel, Bulgaria
People of the Serbo-Bulgarian War
Members of the Internal Macedonian Revolutionary Organization
Bulgarian military personnel
19th-century Bulgarian people
Bulgarian revolutionaries